His Wife's Lover (1931, original Yiddish title Zayn Vaybs Lubovnik) was billed as the "first Jewish musical comedy talking picture". A play before it as a film, it was based on Ferenc Molnár's The Guardsman. Ludwig Satz, who also wrote the songs, plays an actor who disguises himself as an old man, wins the hand of a beautiful young woman, then adopts a different persona and tries to seduce her to test her fidelity.

Satz's performance in this farce has been compared to the work of later Jewish comic performers such as Jerry Lewis.

Notes

External links
 
 
 His Wife's Lover at cine-holocaust.de. This is probably the most detailed online reference, and has an extensive bibliography. Retrieved March 9, 2005.
 Program of The 3rd Annual Jewish Film Festival, University Film Society, Minneapolis, MN, 1999, retrieved March 9, 2005.

1931 films
1931 musical comedy films
1931 romantic comedy films
American musical comedy films
American romantic comedy films
American romantic musical films
American black-and-white films
American films based on plays
Films based on works by Ferenc Molnár
Yiddish-language films
American independent films
1930s romantic musical films
1930s American films